The Utah monolith is a metal pillar that stood in a red sandstone slot canyon in northern San Juan County, Utah, United States. It was unlawfully placed on public land between July and October 2016; it stood unnoticed for over four years until its discovery and removal in late 2020. The identity of its makers is unknown, as are their objectives.

Utah state biologists discovered the monolith in November 2020 during a helicopter survey of wild bighorn sheep. Within days of its discovery, members of the public found the pillar using GPS mapping software and made their way to the remote location. Following intense media coverage, it was covertly removed on November 27, 2020, by four residents of Moab, Utah. After nearly a month in their possession, the monolith was given to the Bureau of Land Management and is currently in their custody.

Following the discovery of the monolith, over two hundred similar metal columns were erected in other places throughout the world, including elsewhere in North America and countries in Europe and South America. Many were built by local artists as deliberate imitations of the Utah monolith.

Discovery 
On November 18, 2020, state biologists of the Utah Division of Wildlife Resources were in southeastern Utah carrying out a survey of bighorn sheep from a helicopter when one of the biologists spotted the pillar and told the pilot, Bret Hutchings, to fly over the location again. Hutchings described the moment:

Hutchings noted that the object appeared man-made, and had been planted in the ground instead of being dropped from the sky.

On November 20, the Utah Department of Public Safety (DPS) posted a photo of the pillar on Instagram. On November 23, the DPS released videos and photographs of the object, but not its exact location, on their website saying: "DPS Aero Bureau Encounters Monolith in Red Rock Country".

Location and dating

The monolith was installed by unknown individuals on public land in a red sandstone slot canyon in Lockhart Basin, in northern San Juan County. It was located in an area that was removed from the Bears Ears National Monument (a protected area in Utah) in 2017; the area was later added once more  to the national monument in 2021. The site had no public services such as parking, restrooms, or cell phone service.

The exact location of the monolith was not disclosed by the DPS, to prevent people from endangering themselves while trying to find it. Within hours of the DPS announcement, Reddit user Tim Slane had identified the object on Google Earth. Slane compared the flight path of the state biologists' helicopter against the red-and-white sandstone terrain from their videos. Slane told The Verge that "he was aided by clues like the cliffs' height, the canyon's erosion pattern (indicating a more exposed area), and a flat floor suggesting it wasn't frequently flooded (and, by extension, was near the top of a watershed)". Google Earth satellite images showed that the monolith was installed between August 2015 and October 2016, and that surrounding scrub vegetation had been cleared.

Dutch journalist Nouska du Saar, who specializes in open-source intelligence, used Maxar satellite images to determine that the monolith appeared between July 7, 2016 and October 21, 2016.

Within 48 hours of the DPS announcement, members of the public had reached the site and uploaded photographs and videos of the monolith to social media. Local residents began to fear a surge in foot traffic could damage local Native American sites and artifacts.

Description
A triangular prism, it had three sides, was not magnetic, and appeared to be made of 1/8th inch stainless steel or aluminum sheets, joined with rivets, with a hollow interior. There was silicone caulk or epoxy along the base, and striking the metal produced a dampened sound indicating some type of insulation inside. The pillar was assembled using blind rivets, indicating human origins but making it difficult to determine its age.

Dave Sparks of the TV show Diesel Brothers went to the monolith and described it in a video he posted on Instagram. "They got a concrete saw and they cut it into the red rock there," he said. "You can see right here on the bottom where they had a couple of over cuts with the saws." Wendy Wischer of the University of Utah's School of Fine Art said, "One person alone could not have done it so there is a group of people who have some knowledge of it somewhere. Most artists want some recognition for what they are doing but this seems to include a level of humor and mystery as part of the intention".

On first discovering the pillar, the DPS described it as a "monolith", a term since repeated by other major media outlets. Although the word monolith refers to a single great stone, the word has also become closely associated with the Monolith from the movie 2001: A Space Odyssey, to which the Utah monolith bears circumstantial resemblance.

Attribution 
The object was compared to works by artist John McCracken (1934–2011), who lived in the southwest desert, believed in the existence of extraterrestrials, and expressed an interest in leaving behind a piece of artwork in the desert. The object resembled the metallic monoliths McCracken made, and was described as "nearly identical" to McCracken's Fair (2011) by New York gallerist David Zwirner (who displays the work). This statement was subsequently retracted by a Zwirner spokesman, who said that it was more likely created by another artist paying homage to McCracken.

It was suggested that the monolith was the work of Petecia Le Fawnhawk, who has installed sculptures in desert locations and lived in Utah, but she has said that it was not her work. A builder of similar monoliths, Derek DeSpain, who "lives in Utah near where the new monolith was found", was also suggested as its creator, based on a screenshot of Instagram images by photographer Eliot Lee Hazel.

The Utah Film Commission said that to their knowledge the monolith was not part of any film production. The New York Times said its unknown origin "provides a pleasant sensation of uncertainty", and that it might "lose its aura and power if we knew who had created it".

Legality

The DPS released a statement quoting Bureau of Land Management (BLM) regulations that it is illegal to install structures (including art), on public lands without permission, "no matter what planet you're from".

The Utah Department of Heritage & Arts said in a statement on their Twitter feed that the monolith is vandalism, and are concerned about damage to ancient artwork and archeological artifacts in the region.

Removal

The Utah division of the Bureau of Land Management (BLM) said that it received credible reports that the monolith was removed on the evening of November 27, 2020, by a then-unknown party, now known to be the Moab-based recreationists Andy Lewis, Sylvan Christensen, Homer Manson, and an anonymous companion. Several adventure photographers posted details and pictures about the dismantling and removal of the monolith. One witness reported that the four men had pushed the monolith over without tools, while onlookers watched, saying "this is why you don't leave trash in the desert" before breaking it apart and carrying away the pieces in a wheelbarrow. The group referred to the conservation ethic of "Leave No Trace". Photos of the site afterwards posted by visitors showed that all was left was a triangular metal piece (see photo), and witnesses reported seeing a pickup truck driving away from the site, carrying an object, as they approached.

The BLM in Utah released the following statement on the agency Facebook page at 5:39 PM on November 28, 2020:

Police in Utah clarified that they would not open an investigation into the removal and the local San Juan County Sheriff's Office said they could not devote the resources, although the Sheriff's Office posted a Most Wanted poster on their Facebook page. On November 30, 2020, the authorities reversed their initial decision, and planned a joint investigation with the Bureau of Land Management. Alan Freestone, chief deputy in San Juan County, confirmed this to The New York Times on December 1, stating: "I know they have some leads, and that's all we are saying right now."

Four days after the monolith's removal, Lewis and Christensen posted a video online entitled "We Removed the Utah monolith", showing what they claimed was themselves and two other people hauling away the Utah monolith in a wheelbarrow. Christensen posted the same video to TikTok and Instagram citing "clear precedents for how we share and standardize the use of our public lands, natural wildlife, native plants, fresh water sources, and human impacts upon them", and highlighting the damage done to the area by the large number of sightseers arriving in an area with no parking facilities or restrooms. In several interviews since the video's release, Christensen said he had received hateful comments and threats of death and physical harm as a result of his video.

On December 20, 2020, over a month after the monolith's initial discovery, Lewis released a pre-recorded video on Instagram, allegedly in response to the numerous death threats, showing what appeared to be the Utah monolith intact in his backyard, contrary to speculation that it had been destroyed. He claimed that he and his friends had also heard of plans to completely destroy it on the night of its eventual removal, plans that they later found to be true, so his team removed it before it could be destroyed by others. He also revealed that they had since donated it to the Bureau of Land Management to investigate its origin and creation, and eventually find a new home for it.

Similar monoliths

Shortly after the discovery of the monolith in Utah, over two hundred additional monoliths which resembled the Utah monolith began appearing at various locations across the world. In some cases, local artists came forward to claim responsibility for them, citing the Utah monolith as their inspiration. Other monoliths were created and installed by small businesses for promotional purposes.

See also 
Minimalism (visual arts)

Site-specific art
Trail ethics

References

External links

 – ABC News, November 24, 2020.
Official BLMUtah Facebook Comments re Missing Monolith, November 29, 2020.
Bureau of Land Management – Utah. "Illegally Installed Structure aka the 'monolith'". Flickr.

2016 establishments in Utah
2016 sculptures
2020 disestablishments in Utah
2020 in Utah
2020s fads and trends
Aluminum sculptures in the United States
Buildings and structures in San Juan County, Utah
Monoliths
Outdoor sculptures in Utah
Works of uncertain authorship
Obelisks in the United States